The 1979–80 La Liga season, the 49th since its establishment, started on September 8, 1979, and finished on May 18, 1980.

Real Madrid achieved their 20th title. They also won the Copa del Rey against their reserve team, Castilla CF; thus Castilla qualified for next season's Cup Winners Cup.

Overview 
Once finished the championship on June 20, 1980, the Competition Committee of the Royal Spanish Football Federation quashed the game of the 31st round between Málaga and Salamanca (0–3), considering that it had been rigged, and sanctioned the salmantino club with the deduction of two points. Thus, Salamanca ended in the 14th position with 30 points and with a record of 12 wins, 8 draws and 13 defeats in 33 games, totaling 34 goals for and 37 against. However, a year later, on May 8, 1981, the Higher Committee of Sports Justice of the Superior Sports Council overturned the sanctions due to lack of evidence.

Teams and locations

League table

Results table

Pichichi Trophy

External links 
 1979/80 Spanish league at RSSSF

La Liga seasons
1979–80 in Spanish football leagues
Spain